We Tell Ourselves Stories in Order to Live: Collected Nonfiction is a 2006 collection of nonfiction by Joan Didion. It was released in the Everyman's Library, a series of reprinted classic literature, as one of the titles chosen to mark the series' 100th anniversary. The title is taken from the opening line of Didion's essay "The White Album" in the book of the same name. We Tell Ourselves Stories in Order to Live includes the full content of her first seven volumes of nonfiction. The contents range in style, including journalism, memoir, and cultural and political commentary.

Critics noted that Didion's distinct literary voice, highlighted by John Leonard's introduction, is apparent throughout the collection. The Chicago Tribune review stated "even the slightest [of her work] tends to have at least a moment when her prose somehow modulates ... transfigures ... kicks the whole thing up a level."

Contents
Introduction by John Leonard
Slouching Towards Bethlehem (originally published 1968)
The White Album (1979)
Salvador (1983)
Miami (1987)
After Henry (1992)
Political Fictions (2001)
Where I Was From (2003)

References

External Links 

 Book page on the official website

2006 non-fiction books
Essay collections by Joan Didion
Alfred A. Knopf books
American essay collections